Mahlabathini is a town in Ugu District Municipality in the KwaZulu-Natal province of South Africa.

Notable people
Chief Mangosuthu Buthelezi, politician and Zulu tribal leader who founded the Inkatha Freedom Party (IFP) in 1975 and was Chief Minister of the KwaZulu bantustan until 1994. He was Minister of Home Affairs of South Africa from 1994 to 2004.
Sfiso Buthelezi, Member of Parliament and former Deputy Finance Minister
Thokozani Langa, South African maskandi musician
Oliver Wakefield (1909-1956), actor and comedian successful in Britain and the U.S.

References

Populated places in the Ulundi Local Municipality